Karol Struski (born 18 January 2001) is a Polish professional footballer who plays as a midfielder for Cypriot side Aris Limassol.

Career statistics

Club

Notes

References

2001 births
Living people
Polish footballers
Poland youth international footballers
Association football midfielders
Ekstraklasa players
I liga players
Górnik Łęczna players
Jagiellonia Białystok players
Aris Limassol FC players
Polish expatriate footballers
Polish expatriate sportspeople in Cyprus
Expatriate footballers in Cyprus